Valea Călugărească is a commune in Prahova County, Muntenia, Romania. It is composed of fifteen villages: Arva, Coslegi, Dârvari, Pantazi, Rachieri, Radila, Schiau, Valea Călugărească, Valea Largă, Valea Mantei, Valea Nicovani, Valea Poienii, Valea Popii, Valea Ursoii and Vârfurile.

Valea Călugărească produces some of the highest quality red wines in Romania, such as Pinot noir and Fetească neagră, but also whites such as Pinot gris and Sauvignon blanc, and two of its own varieties, Fetească albă and Fetească regală. To promote its wine related traditions, Valea Călugărească hosts the largest wine festival in the country every September.

References

Communes in Prahova County
Localities in Muntenia